Santall may refer to three English cricketers of the same family:

John Santall (1907–1986), Worcestershire all-rounder
Reg Santall (1903–1950), Warwickshire batsman
Sydney Santall (1873–1957), Warwickshire bowler, father of Reg and John